Qarah Qach or Qarah Qaj or Qaragaj or Qareh Qach or Qareh Qaj, also rendered as Qara Qaj, may refer to:
 Qarah Qach, Chaharmahal and Bakhtiari
 Qarah Qach, Golestan
 Qarah Qach, Isfahan
 Qareh Qaj, Kermanshah
 Qarah Qach, West Azerbaijan